Alfonso Gibilaro, who was born on 28 September 1888 in Porto Empedocle and who died on 5 January 1957, was a Sicilian pianist, opera coach and composer. Two of his masterpieces—an Ave Maria as well as a Sicilian dialect song entitled Carrettieri—were popularized by the interpretation and sound recordings made by the famous Italian tenor Beniamino Gigli on behalf of His Master's Voice.

Works 

 
  BNF FRBNF13796590
 Fantasia on British Airs for oboe and strings, published Oxford University Press
 Burlesque Serenade
 Menuet de la Poupie
 Rondo des Marionettes

Bibliography

Notes and references

References

Bibliographical references 

Composers from Sicily
1888 births
1957 deaths
20th-century classical composers
20th-century classical pianists
Italian classical composers
Italian classical pianists
Male classical pianists
Italian male pianists
Italian male classical composers
Italian Romantic composers
20th-century Italian composers
20th-century Italian male musicians
19th-century Italian male musicians